John Colvin Donaldson (August 22, 1925 – March 20, 2018) was an American football defensive back who played for the Chicago Hornets and Los Angeles Dons. He played college football at the University of Georgia, having previously attended Jesup High School. He is also a former member of the Georgia Bulldogs coaching staff.

References

1925 births
2018 deaths
American football defensive backs
Georgia Bulldogs football players
Chicago Hornets players
Los Angeles Dons players
Players of American football from Georgia (U.S. state)
People from Jesup, Georgia